Yrjö David Hautala (22 February 1903, Kotka – 30 April 1969) was a Finnish farmer and politician. He was a Member of the Parliament of Finland, representing the People's Party from 1933 to 1936 and the Agrarian League (which renamed itself the Centre Party in 1965) from 1945 to 1958 and again from 1962 to 1966.

References

1903 births
1969 deaths
People from Kotka
People from Viipuri Province (Grand Duchy of Finland)
People's Party (Finland, 1932) politicians
Centre Party (Finland) politicians
Members of the Parliament of Finland (1933–36)
Members of the Parliament of Finland (1945–48)
Members of the Parliament of Finland (1948–51)
Members of the Parliament of Finland (1951–54)
Members of the Parliament of Finland (1954–58)
Members of the Parliament of Finland (1962–66)
Finnish people of World War II